The 1911–12 Swiss National Ice Hockey Championship was the fourth edition of the national ice hockey championship in Switzerland. Six teams participated in the championship, which was won by HC Les Avants, who defeated Club des Patineurs Lausanne in the final.

First round

Group 1

Group 2

Final 
 HC Les Avants - Club des Patineurs Lausanne 2:1

External links 
Swiss Ice Hockey Federation – All-time results

Swiss
Swiss National Ice Hockey Championship seasons
Les Avants